The NFL Top 100 is an annual television series counting down the top one hundred players in the National Football League (NFL), as chosen by fellow NFL players. The rankings are based on an off-season poll organized by the NFL, where players vote on their peers based on their performance for the recent NFL season. Only players that are not retired in the next season are eligible for consideration. In the 12-year history of the countdown, only Tom Brady has been voted No. 1 multiple times (2011, 2017, 2018, and 2022) and voted No. 1 in back-to-back years (2017, 2018).

Series overview

History

The first season of the series was released prior to the 2011 NFL season. NFL Network released ten episodes, each revealing ten players on the list during the 2011 offseason. The first episode, revealing the players ranked #100 through #91 was aired on April 30, 2011. The list's top 10 players were revealed when the tenth episode of the 2011 list was aired on July 3, 2011. The list, and series, began with the #100 ranked player, Washington Redskins quarterback, Donovan McNabb and ended when New England Patriots quarterback and 2010 NFL MVP Tom Brady was selected as the number one ranked player.

The NFL Top 100 list returned for the 2012 NFL season. The season ran from April 28 to June 27, 2012. The list began with  Tennessee Titans running back, Chris Johnson, and concluded the reveal of the number one ranked player, and the 2011 MVP, Green Bay Packers quarterback, Aaron Rodgers. Each episode of the season was followed up by NFL Top 100 Reaction Show, which featured NFL Network analysts reacting and voicing their opinions on the ten most recent players revealed on the list.

The series has ran every offseason since, following the same countdown format, and continuing to feature analysts reacting to the rankings.

See also
National Football League 100th Anniversary All-Time Team
The Top 100: NFL's Greatest Players
Ted Lindsay Award, a similar award given out in the NHL.

References

National Football League lists
American sports television series
NFL Network original programming
2011 American television series debuts
2020s American television series